Blairsville is an unincorporated community in Beaver Creek Township, Hamilton County, Illinois, United States.

References

Unincorporated communities in Hamilton County, Illinois
Unincorporated communities in Illinois